Smash Court Tennis Pro Tournament 2, known in Japan and Australia as  is a tennis game created by Namco for the PlayStation 2 in 2004.

Gameplay
The game features many playable modes including Arcade mode and the in depth Pro tour mode in which you create a player and try to become a tennis champion. Other modes include Exhibition, Challenge and Tutorial. There are a range of courts one can play on, including those at the Australian Open (the old Rebound Ace courts), Roland Garros, Wimbledon and the U.S. Open. Along with various tennis characters, players can unlock characters from the Soulcalibur series (Cassandra Alexandra and Raphael Sorel) and Tekken series (Heihachi Mishima and Ling Xiaoyu).

Reception

Smash Court Tennis Pro Tournament 2 received "average" reviews according to the review aggregation website Metacritic. Ryan Davis of GameSpot said, "PlayStation 2 owners should find plenty to like about Smash Court Tennis Pro Tournament 2." IGNs Ed Lewis said of the game, "Overall, it still isn't the best thing out there, but it's definitely a solid update and holds rather strongly by itself." One specific criticism of the game was that when entering the Davis/Fed-Cup styled 'World Tournament' as a player from a small nation, no realistic name generator was available for partners and other team members. In Japan, Famitsu gave it a score of all four eights for a total of 32 out of 40.

Game notes
 Smash Court Tennis Pro Tournament 2 was a best-selling game, going platinum.
 Another tennis video game was released by Namco exclusive to Europe called Roland Garros 2005. It used the same engine as this game.

See also
Anna Kournikova's Smash Court Tennis
Smash Court Tennis Pro Tournament
Smash Court Tennis 3

References

External links
Official website 

2004 video games
Multiplayer and single-player video games
Namco games
Now Production games
PlayStation 2 games
PlayStation 2-only games
Sony Interactive Entertainment games
Tennis video games
Video games developed in Japan